Greater Kuril Chain - a part of the Kuril Islands - is a group of islands in the Pacific Ocean. It includes North Kurils, Iturup and Kunashir.

At its south western end, the Greater Kuril Chain is separated from the Lesser Kuril Chain by the South Kuril Strait. The maximum altitude in the Greater Kuril Chain is 2339m, on (Atlasov Island).

Length - 1200 km. Total Area - 10,100 km².

Greater Kuril Chain is part of Sakhalin Oblast of Russia. In the southern group of islands, Iturup and Kunashir are under Russian control, but this is  disputed by Japan.

References 

Islands of the Kuril Islands